Boris Alexandrovich Pokrovsky (Russian: Борис Александрович Покровский; 23 January 19125 June 2009) was a Russian opera director, best known as the stage director of the Bolshoi Theatre between 1943 and 1982.

Early life
Pokrovsky was born in Moscow, Russian Empire in 1912.

Early career 
His first production was a staging of Georges Bizet's Carmen in Nizny Novgorod.  He served as the artistic director of the Bolshoi in 1952-1963 and 1973-1982 and was named a People's Artist of the USSR in 1961. His production of Vano Muradeli's opera The Great Friendship was the target of the second Zhdanov Ukase (1948), and it was he who first staged Sergei Prokofiev's War and Peace, in 1946.  He took this opera to Italy for its first full staging there, in 1964.

In 1965 in Moscow he directed the first Russian-language production of Benjamin Britten's A Midsummer Night's Dream.

Career 
In 1972 Pokrovsky founded the Moscow Chamber Opera Theater with Gennady Rozhdestvensky, and he produced operas such as Igor Stravinsky's The Rake's Progress, Alfred Schnittke's Life with an Idiot, and in 1974 the first Soviet production of Dmitri Shostakovich's The Nose since 1929.

In 1975 he took the Bolshoi Theatre on its first American tour.

Awards and honors 
Pokrovsky's many awards include four Stalin Prizes (1947, 1948, 1949, 1950), a Lenin Prize (1980), two Orders of Lenin (1967, 1976), Order For Merit to the Fatherland of 3rd (1997), 2nd (2002) and 1st (2007) degree, as well as two State Prizes (1995, 2004).

Family 
He was the father of actress Alla Pokrovskaya, father-in-law of Mariya Lemesheva, and the grandfather of actor Mikhail Yefremov. His second wife was the soprano Irina Maslennikova.

Death 
Boris Pokrovsky died in Moscow in 2009.

Notes

1912 births
2009 deaths
Russian opera directors
People's Artists of the USSR
Stalin Prize winners
Recipients of the Order "For Merit to the Fatherland", 1st class
Recipients of the Order "For Merit to the Fatherland", 2nd class
Recipients of the Order "For Merit to the Fatherland", 3rd class
Recipients of the Order of the Cross of Terra Mariana, 3rd Class
Musicians from Moscow
Russian Academy of Theatre Arts alumni
Burials at Novodevichy Cemetery
Soviet opera directors